The 1977 Tulsa Golden Hurricane football team represented the University of Tulsa in the 1977 NCAA Division I football season. Competing as a member of the Missouri Valley Conference (MVC), the team was led by first-year head coach John Cooper and played its home games at Skelly Stadium. Tulsa compiled an overall record of 3–8 with a  conference mark of 2–3, tying for fourth place in the MVC.

Schedule

Coaching staff
 John Cooper – Head Coach
 Mel Foels – Assistant Coach
 Harvey Jones – Assistant Coach
 Larry Marmie – Defensive Coordinator
 Stan McGarvey – Offensive Backfield/Recruiting Coordinator
 Tom Ososkie – Assistant Coach
 Mike Sweatman – Assistant Coach
 Steve Walters – Assistant Coach
 John Wittenborn – Assistant Coach

Notes

References

Tulsa
Tulsa Golden Hurricane football seasons
Tulsa Golden Hurricane football